Clive Rushton (27 October 1947 – 11 June 2017) was a British international swimmer.

Career
He competed in the men's 100 metre backstroke at the 1972 Summer Olympics.  He later became a swimming coach.

He represented England in the backstroke events, at the 1970 British Commonwealth Games in Edinburgh, Scotland. At the ASA National British Championships he won the 1969 110 yards backstroke title and the 1969 220 yards backstroke title.

Rushton died from cancer on 11 June 2017 at the age of 69.

References

External links
 

1947 births
2017 deaths
British male swimmers
Olympic swimmers of Great Britain
Swimmers at the 1972 Summer Olympics
Sportspeople from Rochdale
Deaths from cancer in England
Swimmers at the 1970 British Commonwealth Games
Commonwealth Games competitors for England
British male backstroke swimmers